James Carew (23 January 1872 – 1 September 1950) was an Australian cricketer. He played in thirteen first-class matches for Queensland between 1898 and 1906.

See also
 List of Queensland first-class cricketers

References

External links
 

1872 births
1950 deaths
Australian cricketers
Queensland cricketers
Cricketers from Queensland